Singularia leptochorda is a moth of the family Pterophoridae. It is found in Costa Rica, Ecuador and Venezuela.

The wingspan is 12–25 mm. The head is scaled with mixed grey-white and dark brown scales. The antennae are grey-brown. The thorax is olive brown and grey-white mixed, with a double whitish line at the dorsum and laterally a single longitudinal line. The forewings are dark brown with white lines and a white transverse band. The fringes are blocked brown and white. The underside of the forewing is chocolate-brown turning pale in both lobes toward the apex. The hindwings and fringes are brown-grey. The underside of the hindwings is dark brown, but paler toward apex of all lobes. Adults have been recorded in February and May.

References

Moths described in 1913
Pterophorini